Cantua Creek (formerly, Cantua and Cantuna) is a census-designated place (CDP) in Fresno County, California, United States. As of the 2010 census, the population was 466, down from the 655 reported at the 2000 census.

Geography

Climate
According to the Köppen Climate Classification system, Cantua Creek has a semi-arid climate, abbreviated "BSk" on climate maps.

History

The community of Cantua Creek is located near Cantua Creek, a tributary of the Fresno Slough that flows down from the Coast Range to the west toward the Fresno Slough.  That creek originally, Arroyo de Cantua, was a stopping place on the El Camino Viejo. The hideout of Joaquin Murrieta was located in the vicinity of this creek in the mountains to the west of this community.

The Cantua post office operated in 1888, and from 1890 to 1892. The Cantua Creek post office opened in 1941.

Demographics

2010
The 2010 United States Census reported that Cantua Creek had a population of 466. The racial makeup of Cantua Creek was 244 (52.4%) White, 5 (1.1%) African American, 3 (0.6%) Native American, 1 (0.2%) Asian, 0 (0.0%) Pacific Islander, 199 (42.7%) from other races, and 14 (3.0%) from two or more races. Hispanic or Latino of any race were 461 persons (98.9%).

The Census reported that 461 people (98.9% of the population) lived in households, 5 (1.1%) lived in non-institutionalized group quarters, and 0 (0%) were institutionalized.

There were 113 households, out of which 66 (58.4%) had children under the age of 18 living in them, 77 (68.1%) were opposite-sex married couples living together, 15 (13.3%) had a female householder with no husband present, 12 (10.6%) had a male householder with no wife present.  There were 6 (5.3%) unmarried opposite-sex partnerships, and 0 (0%) same-sex married couples or partnerships. 6 households (5.3%) were made up of individuals, and 1 (0.9%) had someone living alone who was 65 years of age or older. The average household size was 4.08.  There were 104 families (92.0% of all households); the average family size was 4.24.

The population was spread out, with 144 people (30.9%) under the age of 18, 56 people (12.0%) aged 18 to 24, 137 people (29.4%) aged 25 to 44, 92 people (19.7%) aged 45 to 64, and 37 people (7.9%) who were 65 years of age or older.  The median age was 28.0 years. For every 100 females, there were 130.7 males.  For every 100 females age 18 and over, there were 133.3 males.

The homeowner vacancy rate was 0%; the rental vacancy rate was 8.5%.  198 people (42.5% of the population) lived in owner-occupied housing units and 263 people (56.4%) lived in rental housing units.

2000
As of the census of 2000, there were 655 people, 141 households, and 131 families residing in the CDP. The racial makeup of the CDP was 42.60% White, 0.15% Black or African American, 0.61% Native American, 52.06% from other races, and 4.58% from two or more races.  93.74% of the population were Hispanic or Latino of any race.

There were 141 households, out of which 66.7% had children under the age of 18 living with them, 80.1% were married couples living together, 3.5% had a female householder with no husband present, and 6.4% were non-families. 2.8% of all households were made up of individuals, and none had someone living alone who was 65 years of age or older.  The average household size was 4.51 and the average family size was 4.52.

In the CDP, the population was spread out, with 36.5% under the age of 18, 14.5% from 18 to 24, 29.6% from 25 to 44, 16.2% from 45 to 64, and 3.2% who were 65 years of age or older.  The median age was 24 years. For every 100 females, there were 134.8 males.  For every 100 females age 18 and over, there were 132.4 males.

The median income for a household in the CDP was $26,484, and the median income for a family was $26,484. Males had a median income of $0 versus $26,250 for females. The per capita income for the CDP was $5,693.  About 26.7% of families and 38.1% of the population were below the poverty line, including 46.2% of those under age 18 and none of those age 65 or over.

References

Census-designated places in Fresno County, California
Populated places established in 1888
Census-designated places in California